These are the official results of the Men's 400 metres hurdles event at the 1982 European Championships in Athens, Greece, held at Olympic Stadium "Spiros Louis" on 6, 7, and 8 September 1982.

Medalists

Results

Final
8 September

Semi-finals
7 September

Semi-final 1

Semi-final 2

Heats
6 September

Heat 1

Heat 2

Heat 3

Participation
According to an unofficial count, 21 athletes from 15 countries participated in the event.

 (1)
 (2)
 (1)
 (2)
 (1)
 (1)
 (1)
 (1)
 (1)
 (1)
 (3)
 (2)
 (2)
 (1)
 (1)

See also
 1978 Men's European Championships 400m Hurdles (Prague)
 1980 Men's Olympic 400m Hurdles (Moscow)
 1983 Men's World Championships 400m Hurdles (Helsinki)
 1984 Men's Olympic 400m Hurdles (Moscow)
 1986 Men's European Championships 400m Hurdles (Stuttgart)
 1987 Men's World Championships 400m Hurdles (Rome)
 1988 Men's Olympic 400m Hurdles (Seoul)

References

 Results

400 metres hurdles
400 metres hurdles at the European Athletics Championships